The 2005 Summer Deaflympics, officially known as the 20th Summer Deaflympics, is an international multi-sport event that was celebrated from 5 January to 16 January 2005 in Melbourne, Australia.

Bidding process

A bid for the games was held on 9 March 1999 in Davos, Switzerland.
Melbourne,  - 59
Košice,  - 33

Venues
The games were held at eleven different venues.
 Olympic Park - Athletics (track and field), Football, Opening and closing ceremonies
 Melbourne Sports and Aquatic Centre - Badminton, Basketball, Handball, Aquatics (Swimming, Water polo), Table tennis, Volleyball (Indoor), Wrestling
 Ballarat City Oval and Victoria Park - Athletics (Marathon)
 Ballarat - Cycling (1000m Sprint Event, 50 km Individual Point Race, 35 km Time Trial), Orienteering
 Buninyong - Cycling (100 km Road Race)
 Green Gully Reserve - Football
 Kingston Heath Reserve - Football
 Melbourne International Shooting Centre - Shooting
 Boroondara Tennis Centre - Tennis
 Sunshine AMF Bowling Centre - Bowling
 St Kilda Beach - Volleyball (Beach)

Sports
The various sports offered at the 2005 Summer Deaflympics were held in 17 disciplines, including 11 individual sports and 6 team sports:

Individual sports

Team sports
 Basketball
 Beach volleyball
 Football
 Handball
 Volleyball
 Water polo

Medal tally

See also
 1956 Summer Olympics
 2006 Commonwealth Games
 2026 Commonwealth Games

References

 Only Melbourne 
 YouTube - Melbourne 2005 Deaflympic Games 
 Deaflympics - 2005 Melbourne Deaflympics 
 1999 CISS Minutes No.22 Bidding 

 
Deaflympics
Multi-sport events in Australia
Sports competitions in Melbourne
Parasports in Australia
Deaflympics
Deaflympics
2000s in Melbourne
January 2005 sports events in Australia